Darzi Kola (also Romanized as Darzī Kolā; also known as Darzī Kūlā) is a village in Estakhr-e Posht Rural District, Hezarjarib District, Neka County, Mazandaran Province, Iran. At the 2006 census, its population was 122, in 24 families.

References 

Populated places in Neka County